"Touch Too Much" is a song by the Australian hard rock band AC/DC. It was released on their 1979 album Highway to Hell, their last with lead vocalist Bon Scott, who died the following year.

Overview
The song was performed by Scott and AC/DC on BBC music show Top of the Pops, 12 days before his death. This episode, dated 7 February 1980, was repeated by BBC Four on 19 February 2015, the 35th anniversary of Scott's death.

The band had earlier recorded another song with vastly different words and music entitled "Touch Too Much", but the song was never released. That track would eventually see the light of day in 1997 when it was included in Volts, part of the band's Bonfire box set.

The cover of the single in many territories was released with the band photograph flipped horizontally, incorrectly showing the Youngs and bassist Cliff Williams as playing left-handed.

The music video was live rehearsal performance from If You Want Blood Tour 1978-1979, along with "Walk All Over You" on the Family Jewels DVD compilation.

Prior to joining AC/DC on the Rock or Bust World Tour, Axl Rose said this was his favourite AC/DC song.  The song was first performed live on 22 May 2016 in Prague.

Reception
Cash Box called it "high voltage rock...with Bon Scott's gritty vocals and Angus Young's scrappy lead guitar work," and praised the hook.

Charts

Weekly charts

Year-end charts

Personnel
Bon Scott – vocals
Angus Young – lead guitar
Malcolm Young – rhythm guitar, backing vocals
Cliff Williams – bass guitar, backing vocals
Phil Rudd – drums

Cover versions 
 Serbian hard rock band Cactus Jack recorded a version on their live cover album DisCover in 2002.

References

 

AC/DC songs
1979 songs
1980 singles
Song recordings produced by Robert John "Mutt" Lange
Songs written by Angus Young
Songs written by Bon Scott
Songs written by Malcolm Young
Atlantic Records singles